Delia Phyllis Daphne Heard (21 August 1904 – 22 June 1983) was an English actress and acting teacher. She was born in Plymouth, Devon. She appeared in numerous made-for-TV movies and TV series. But was perhaps best known in latter years as Richard's elderly mother Mrs. Polouvicka in To the Manor Born.

Film 
Her film credits include roles in Goodbye Gemini (1970), the film version of Please Sir! (1971) as an old gypsy, Jude the Obscure (1971) as Drusilla Fawley, and The Triple Echo (1972). She also appeared as the nanny in Laurence Olivier's film Three Sisters (1970) based on the Anton Chekhov play, with Joan Plowright, Alan Bates and Olivier himself as Chebutikin.

Television and radio 
She performed in many other television serials, including Wild, Wild Women, Doctor Who (in a story-stealing turn in the serial Image of the Fendahl as white witch 'Granny' Tyler), the sitcom Don't Forget to Write! as Mrs Field the cleaner, Z-Cars and Nanny Webster  in Upstairs, Downstairs, series 2, episode 8, Out of the Everywhere. In 1966, she was cast as a beleaguered tenant in Vacant Possession, a TV play produced by Rediffusion. From its inception until her death in 1983, she played the part of Maud, the eccentric housekeeper, in the Hinge and Bracket radio series.

In 1971, Heard starred in a couple of episodes in the TV sitcom For the Love of Ada playing the nosey, next door neighbour.

In 1974, she played the part of Mrs. Froggitt in the pilot episode of Oh No It's Selwyn Froggitt.

Teaching career 
During the 1950s and 1960s, she was a member of the teaching staff at the Bristol Old Vic Theatre School.

Filmography

References

External links

a young Daphne Heard in the play She Stoops To Conquer(Univ. of Washington Sayre Collection)(*url updated)
Daphne Heard(Aveleyman)

1904 births
1983 deaths
20th-century British actresses
Actresses from Plymouth, Devon
English stage actresses
English television actresses
20th-century English women
20th-century English people
20th-century British businesspeople